Here We Go Round the Mulberry Bush is a traditional nursery rhyme. The phrase may also refer to:
Here We Go Round the Mulberry Bush (novel), by Hunter Davies
Here We Go Round the Mulberry Bush (film), based on the book
Here We Go Round the Mulberry Bush (Traffic song), the title song to the film, performed by Traffic